A. J. Foyt Racing, officially and historically known as A. J. Foyt Enterprises, is an American racing team in the IndyCar Series and formerly NASCAR. It is owned by four-time Indianapolis 500 winner, 1972 Daytona 500 winner, 1967 24 Hours of Le Mans winner, and two-time 24 Hours of Daytona winner A. J. Foyt. Foyt won two of his four Indianapolis 500s driving for the team. The team also won the 1999 Indianapolis 500 and the IRL championship in 1996 and 1998.

USAC National Championship
The team was founded in 1965 and won three National Championship (in 1967, 1975 and 1979) and two Indianapolis 500 (in 1967 and 1977), all with A. J. Foyt at the wheel.

CART
During the CART years, A. J. Foyt Enterprises seldom ran a full-season schedule. The team ran partial schedules through 1987, with A. J. Foyt himself driving the primary car. The team usually entered all three 500-mile races (Indianapolis, Michigan, and Pocono), and selected races, mostly on ovals. The team ran cars for additional drivers, particularly at Indy, including George Snider, Davy Jones, Stan Fox, Rocky Moran and others. At the 1987 Indianapolis 500 the Foyt team notably qualified four team cars, with Foyt starting 4th, and Fox finishing 7th.

In 1988, the team increased its participation and went back to a full-time schedule. Foyt posted four top-five finishes between 1988-1990. A devastating crash at Road America in 1990 saw Foyt suffer serious leg injuries, and he required lengthy rehabilitation. Foyt returned in 1991 and retired in May 1993. The team ran nine different drivers in 1992, then signed promising rookie Robby Gordon for the 1993 season. Gordon notched ten top-ten finishes including a 2nd place at Mid-Ohio.

For 1994, the team initially signed Davy Jones, but parted ways with him after only three races. At Indianapolis, they picked up rookie Bryan Herta mid-month, and survived a Bump Day scare to hold on and make the field. Herta posted a 9th place finish on race day and ran four additional races with the team. The team then hired Eddie Cheever to finish out the 1994 season. Cheever stayed with the team for 1995 but saw little success.

A. J. Foyt Enterprises never won a CART-sanctioned event during its participation from 1979 to 1995. At the 1995 Bosch Spark Plug Grand Prix, Eddie Cheever was leading the race with just over one lap to go when the car ran out of fuel. It would be the closest the team came to winning a CART race. The team's best CART series finish was 2nd place, on two occasions.

IndyCar Series

Foyt Enterprises won IRL titles in 1996 with Scott Sharp and 1998 with Kenny Bräck. Bräck also won the Indianapolis 500 for the team in 1999.

In 2006 the team hoped to resurrect itself with experienced driver Felipe Giaffone and a more level playing ground brought by a spec engine. However, after a strong start to the season, the team struggled after the Indianapolis 500 and parted ways with Giaffone after the eighth race. Jeff Bucknum was brought in to fill the seat for the rest of the year.

In 2007 Foyt announced that Larry Foyt would take over as team manager and Darren Manning was signed as the team's driver. Manning captured three top-five finishes in his two years with the team, including a second place in 2008 at Watkins Glen International. However, with high-profile veteran Vítor Meira becoming available following the 2008 season, Foyt signed him to replace Manning.

Foyt Enterprises began the 2009 IndyCar Series season sponsored by ABC Supply and fielding Vítor Meira, who was injured in the Indianapolis 500. Ryan Hunter-Reay and Paul Tracy took over driving duties for the rest of the 2009 season. Meira returned in 2010 but split with the team after the season. Japanese driver Takuma Sato joined Foyt's team in 2013, winning that year at Long Beach. The team announced in October that they would field a second car (No. 41) full-time in 2015 for Jack Hawksworth.

For the balance of its 2021 Indycar campaign, Foyt Enterprises currently fields two full-time drivers, Sébastien Bourdais alongside Dalton Kellett, with part-timers Charlie Kimball and J. R. Hildebrand in spare chassis designated for Indianapolis, only. 

No Foyt Enterprise entry has scored an Indycar victory since 2013.

NASCAR Cup Series

No. 14 history
The No. 14 started as the No. 50 when A. J. Foyt began fielding NASCAR teams in 1973 part-time, driving the Purolator-sponsored Chevrolet. He drove for the team on a very limited schedule throughout the seventies, picking up one pole and nine top-tens. Ron Hutcherson was the first driver besides Foyt to drive the car, and later Johnny Rutherford drove for the team in 1978. In the 1980s, Foyt was almost the sole driver of the team, and switched to the No. 14 with a Valvoline sponsorship in 1983, and posted his final career Top 5 at Talladega two years later in the Copenhagen-sponsored car. In 1989, Tracy Leslie drove for the team in a pair of races, finishing 20th at Michigan International Speedway. Foyt did not drive in the 1991 season. Instead, he allowed Mike Chase to drive for him. This driver finished no better than 25th. Foyt, afterward, did not field a team until the inaugural Brickyard 400 in 1994, when he qualified 40th and finished 30th in the No. 50. Foyt would attempt the Brickyard in 1995 and 1996 but did not qualify for either race, forcing his permanent retirement. 

During the 1999 season, rumors began spreading that Foyt would revive his defunct operation to compete in the Cup Series. After several months, it was announced that Foyt would hire rookie Mike Bliss as the driver of the No. 14 Conseco-sponsored Pontiac Grand Prix. Bliss qualified for the Daytona 500, but after failing to do so for the next three races, he was released and briefly replaced by Dick Trickle. After getting an offer from another team, Trickle would leave as well. He would be replaced by Rick Mast after he and several crew members left the bankrupt Larry Hedrick Motorsports team. Mast stayed with the team for the rest of the season and had two Top 10s at Pocono and Bristol. In 2001, Ron Hornaday Jr. was selected as the team's driver, but he only posted only one Top 10 in Las Vegas and was dismissed at the end of the season.

Following Hornaday's departure, Stacy Compton began driving for the team starting in 2002. After posting only three Top 20 finishes, Compton left the team, and P. J. Jones took over at the Sirius Satellite Radio at the Glen, and posted the team's best finish of fourth. Mike Wallace was then designated as the driver, posting a 10th-place run at Bristol Motor Speedway. It had been originally announced Foyt would field two cars in 2003 with Wallace in the 14, and his adopted son Larry Foyt in a second car with sponsorship from Harrah's. Unfortunately, Conseco filed for bankruptcy, leaving only one car with Larry driving. The team also switched its Cup team to Dodge with engines provided by Evernham Motorsports. Foyt only qualified for 20 races with a best finish of 16th and finished 41st in points. Harrah's left at the end of 2003, and Larry Foyt qualified for three races in 2004 but did not obtain major sponsorship, leaving the team inactive. Later in the season, Foyt sold his owner's points to ppc Racing's new Cup team. A. J. Foyt Racing officially closed their Cup team in 2006, following an auction of the team's NASCAR equipment in August.

No. 41 history
Foyt Racing also briefly expanded to a two-car team at the 2000 season finale, the NAPA 500, when they fielded the No. 41 for Foyt's son Larry but did not make the race.

The team also ran a second car again in 2001 at Atlanta Motor Speedway, with Mark Green driving, but did not qualify.

The team also ran a second car yet again in 2002 at Indianapolis Motor Speedway, with P. J. Jones but the number changed from No. 41 to No. 50.

NASCAR Xfinity Series

No. 14 history
In 2001, Foyt started a Busch team, the No. 14 Harrah's Chevrolet, driven by Larry Foyt. Despite failing to finish in the top ten, Foyt finished 22nd in points overall.

In the Busch Series for 2002, Foyt had two top-tens and improved one spot in the points.

Racing results

Complete CART Indy Car World Series results
(key)

Complete IRL IndyCar Series results
(key) (Results in bold indicate pole position; results in italics indicate fastest lap)

* Season still in progress

 Billy Boat was originally scored as the winner of the 1997 True Value 500 until it was discovered afterward that a scoring error had mistakenly put several drivers multiple laps down during the race. Arie Luyendyk was ultimately declared the winner.
 The 1999 VisionAire 500K at Charlotte was cancelled after 79 laps due to spectator fatalities.
 Non-points-paying, exhibition race.
 The final race at Las Vegas was canceled due to Dan Wheldon's death.

IndyCar wins

Drivers who have driven for A. J. Foyt Enterprises

USAC National Championship
 A. J. Foyt (1965–1979)
 Al Unser (1965)
 George Snider (1966, 1969–1970, 1972–1974, 1978)
 Joe Leonard (1967)
 Jim Hurtubise (1967)
 Jim McElreath (1968, 1970)
 Carl Williams (1968)
 Roger McCluskey (1969)
 Donnie Allison (1970–1971)
 Sam Sessions (1972, 1974)
 Rick Muther (1975)
 Bill Vukovich II (1977)

CART
 A. J. Foyt (1979–1993)
 George Snider (1980, 1983–1987, 1992)
 Johnny Rutherford (1984, 1988)
 Chip Ganassi (1985)
 Sammy Swindell (1986)
 Stan Fox (1987–1988)
 Davy Jones (1987, 1994)
 Rocky Moran (1988–1989)
 Mike Groff (1991–1992)
 Bernard Jourdain (1991)
 Al Unser, Sr. (1991)
 Jeff Andretti (1992)
 Jon Beekhuis (1992)
 Brian Bonner (1992)
 Pancho Carter (1992)
 Gregor Foitek (1992)
 Ross Cheever (1992)
 Robby Gordon (1993)
 John Andretti (1993–1994)
 Davy Jones (1994)
 Bryan Herta (1994)
 Eddie Cheever (1994–1995)
 Fredrik Ekblom (1995)
 Scott Sharp (1995)
 Brian Till (1995)

INDYCAR
 Marco Greco (1996)
 Mike Groff (1996)
 Davey Hamilton (1996–1997)
 Scott Sharp (1996–1997)
 Paul Durant (1997)
 Billy Boat (1997–2000)
 Greg Ray (1998, 2001–2002)
 Kenny Bräck (1998–1999)
 Robbie Buhl (1999)
 Jeff Ward (2000)
 Eliseo Salazar (2000–2002)
 Robby Gordon (2001)
 Donnie Beechler (2001–2002)
 Richie Hearn (2002)
 Airton Daré (2002–2003)
 A. J. Foyt IV (2003–2005, 2009)
 Shigeaki Hattori (2003)
 Larry Foyt (2004–2006)
 Jeff Bucknum (2005–2006)
 Felipe Giaffone (2005–2006)
 Al Unser Jr. (2007)
 Darren Manning (2007–2008)
 Ryan Hunter-Reay (2009)
 Paul Tracy (2009)
 Vítor Meira (2009–2011)
 Mike Conway (2012)
 Takuma Sato (2013–2016)
 Conor Daly  (2013, 2017)
 Martin Plowman  (2014)
 Jack Hawksworth (2015–2016)
 Alex Tagliani (2015–2016)
 Carlos Muñoz (2017)
 Zach Veach (2017)
 Tony Kanaan (2018–2020)
 Matheus Leist (2018–2019)
 Sébastien Bourdais (2020-present)
 Dalton Kellett (2020-present)
 Charlie Kimball (2020)

NASCAR

Cup Series
 A. J. Foyt (1973–1974, 1977–1990, 1994)
 Johnny Rutherford (1977)
 Ron Hutcherson (1978)
 Don Whittington (1980)
 Tracy Leslie (1989)
 Mike Chase (1991)
 Mike Bliss (2000)
 Rick Mast (2000)
 Dick Trickle (2000)
 Ron Hornaday Jr. (2001)
 Stacy Compton (2002)
 P. J. Jones (2002)
 Mike Wallace (2002)
 Larry Foyt (2003–2004)

Grand National Series
 Larry Foyt (2001–2002)
 Mark Green (2001)
 David Starr (2001)

Truck Series
 Joe Bessey (1997)
 Ken Schrader (1997)

USAC Silver Crown
 Josh Wise (2006)
 Tracy Hines (2007)
 Pablo Donoso (2007)

References

External links

Official website
IndyCar team page
NASCAR ownership statistics

Companies based in Texas
Defunct NASCAR teams
IndyCar Series teams
American auto racing teams
Champ Car teams
Indy Lights teams
American companies established in 1965
Auto racing teams established in 1965